Qohestan Rural District is in Qohestan District of Darmian County, South Khorasan province, Iran. At the National Census of 2006, its population was 9,849 in 2,819 households. There were 7,275 inhabitants in 2,158 households at the following census of 2011. At the most recent census of 2016, the population of the rural district was 7,084 in 2,136 households. The largest of its 41 villages was Khuniksar, with 1,118 people.

References 

Darmian County

Rural Districts of South Khorasan Province

Populated places in South Khorasan Province

Populated places in Darmian County